Stanley Tobias Wilson Jr. (November 5, 1982 – February 1, 2023) was an American professional football player who was a cornerback in the National Football League (NFL). He was selected by the Detroit Lions in the third round of the 2005 NFL Draft. He played college football for the Stanford Cardinal.

Early life
The son of former Cincinnati Bengals running back Stanley Wilson Sr., Stanley Jr. grew up in Carson, California, with his grandparents and attended Bishop Montgomery High School in Torrance.

College career
Recruited by Tyrone Willingham, Wilson enrolled at Stanford University in 2000. After redshirting his true freshman season, Wilson played four seasons on the Stanford Cardinal football team from 2001 to 2004, the last three under coach Walt Harris. Wilson became a regular starter as a sophomore in 2002, with 32 tackles (27 solo) and two interceptions. In 2003, Wilson had 27 tackles, six passes defended, and one interception. As a senior in 2004, Wilson recorded career highs with 54 tackles (41 solo and 2.5 for loss) and five passes defended, in addition to one interception returned for 51 yards, and earned honorable mention All-Pac-10 honors.

Professional career

In the 2005 NFL draft, the Detroit Lions picked Wilson in the third round (72nd overall). Wilson's NFL career lasted from 2005 to 2007, all with the Lions. In 32 games (nine starts) in the NFL, Wilson had 86 tackles (63 solo), eight passes deflected, and one forced fumble. On November 28, 2007, Wilson was placed on injured reserve due to a knee injury.

The Lions re-signed Wilson to a one-year deal on April 11, 2008. However, Wilson tore his Achilles tendon during an exhibition game against the New York Giants on August 7, an injury later revealed to be career-ending.

Personal life

Legal issues
On June 22, 2016, Wilson was shot by an elderly homeowner in Portland, Oregon, after Wilson attempted to break into the man's home while naked. He was hospitalized but recovered from his injuries and was charged with attempted burglary. In November 2016, Wilson tested positive for methamphetamines. He was arrested again in Portland on January 10, 2017, while again nude; the arresting officer noted he appeared to be on drugs when he was caught roaming naked around another neighborhood.

On February 13, 2017, Wilson was sentenced to 10 days in jail with three years of probation for the June incident where he was shot; the judge also ordered him to undergo drug treatment, pay restitution for damages caused to homes, and write apology letters. On February 18, 2017, Wilson was arrested naked a third time allegedly attempting to burglarize a home.

Death
On February 1, 2023, Wilson died after collapsing at Metropolitan State Hospital in Los Angeles County. He was 40.

References

External links

Detroit Lions bio
Stanford Cardinal bio

1982 births
2023 deaths
People from Carson, California
African-American players of American football
American football cornerbacks
Stanford Cardinal football players
Detroit Lions players
Players of American football from California
Sportspeople from Los Angeles County, California
21st-century African-American sportspeople
20th-century African-American people